Cephalotheca is a genus of fungi in the Cephalothecaceae family of the Ascomycota. The relationship of this taxon to other taxa within the Sordariomycetes class is unknown (incertae sedis), and it has not yet been placed with certainty into any order.

References

External links
Index Fungorum

Sordariomycetes enigmatic taxa
Sordariomycetes genera
Taxa named by Karl Wilhelm Gottlieb Leopold Fuckel